60 Serpentis, also known as c Serpentis, is a single, orange-hued star in Serpens Cauda, the eastern section of the constellation Serpens. It is faintly visible to the naked eye with an apparent visual magnitude of 5.38. It is moving further from the Sun with a heliocentric radial velocity of +28 km/s, having approached as close as  some 1.9 million years ago.

This is an evolved K-type giant star with a stellar classification of K0 III, having used up its core hydrogen and expanded. At the age of around 1.26 billion years, it currently belongs to the so-called "red clump", which indicates it is on the horizontal branch and is generating energy through helium fusion at its core. The star has an estimated 1.8 times the mass of the Sun and 8 times the Sun's radius. It is radiating 35 times the Sun's luminosity from its enlarged photosphere at an effective temperature of about 5,059 K.

References

K-type giants
Horizontal-branch stars
Serpens (constellation)
Serpentis, c
Durchmusterung objects
Serpentis, 60
170474
090642
6935